Tennessee's 14th Senate district is one of 33 districts in the Tennessee Senate. It has been represented by Republican Shane Reeves since a 2018 special election to replace fellow Republican Jim Tracy.

Geography
District 14 stretches from eastern Murfreesboro to the Alabama border in Middle Tennessee, covering part of Rutherford County and all of Bedford, Lincoln, Marshall, and Moore Counties. Other communities in the district include Shelbyville, Lewisburg, Lynchburg, Fayetteville, and Park City.

The district is located entirely within Tennessee's 4th congressional district, and overlaps with the 34th, 37th, 39th, 48th, 62nd, and 92nd districts of the Tennessee House of Representatives. It borders the state of Alabama.

Recent election results
Tennessee Senators are elected to staggered four-year terms, with odd-numbered districts holding elections in midterm years and even-numbered districts holding elections in presidential years.

2020

2018 special
In March 2018, a special election was held to replace Republican Jim Tracy, who resigned in 2017 to become Tennessee State Director of USDA Rural Development.

2016

2012

Federal and statewide results in District 14

References

14
Bedford County, Tennessee
Lincoln County, Tennessee
Marshall County, Tennessee
Moore County, Tennessee
Rutherford County, Tennessee